Maria of Aragon may refer to:
Marie of Montpellier (1182–1213), wife of Peter II of Aragon
Marie of Lusignan, Queen of Aragon (1273–1319), wife of James II of Aragon
Maria of Aragon (1299–1316), daughter of James II of Aragon, wife of Infante Peter, Lord of Cameros
Maria of Navarre (1329–1347), wife of Peter IV of Aragon
Maria de Luna (1358–1406), wife of Martin I of Aragon
Maria of Aragon, Queen of Castile (1396–1445), daughter of Ferdinand I of Aragon, wife of John II of Castile
Maria of Castile (1401–1458), wife of Alfonso V of Aragon
Maria of Aragon, Queen of Portugal (1482–1517), daughter of Isabella of Castile and Ferdinand II of Aragon, and second wife of Manuel I of Portugal
Maria d'Aragona (1503–1568), Marchese of Vasto, daughter of Ferdinando di Montalto
Maria of Aragon (1505–1558), daughter of Joanna of Castile and Philip I of Castile, and wife of Louis II of Hungary

See also
Maria of Castile (disambiguation)
Marisa Aragón